The Sadat Lecture for Peace is a lecture series at the University of Maryland, College Park, which began in 1997 when the Anwar Sadat Chair for Peace and Development was established within The Center for International Development and Conflict Management (which is associated with the Department of Government & Politics). The Sadat Chair, currently held by Shibley Telhami, was established by Jehan Sadat in memory of her late husband, Anwar Sadat, the former President of Egypt.

References

University of Maryland, College Park
University of Maryland College of Behavioral and Social Sciences
Lecture series